Enniskillen Gaels is a Gaelic Athletic Association club in based in Enniskillen, County Fermanagh, Northern Ireland.

History
The club completed a six-in-a-row of Fermanagh titles between 1998 and 2003. Gaels reached the final of the Ulster Senior Club Football Championship twice during this period, losing to Crossmaglen Rangers in 1999 and to Errigal Ciarán in 2002. The bid for seven championships in a row was ended by Derrygonnelly Harps in the 2004 county final. That great team went on to win one further county title in 2006.

The club went into decline over the next decade, and by 2016, were on the brink of relegation to Junior football, scraping through a relegation play-off.

Backboned by the 2017 Ulster Minor winning team, the club would claim the Fermanagh Intermediate crown in 2020. In the team's first year at senior, they reached the county final. A youthful Gaels team lost by nine points to Derrygonnelly.

The Gaels reached their second consecutive final in 2022, facing Erne Gaels Belleek. Enniskillen were comfortable winners and ended a 16-year wait for the New York Cup.

Notable players
 Kieran McKenna is a former underage player.
 Jim Cleary

Honours

Football
 Ulster Senior Club Football Championship: (0)
 Runners Up 1999, 2002
 Fermanagh Senior Football Championship: (13)
 1930, 1976, 1978, 1987, 1992, 1998, 1999, 2000, 2001, 2002, 2003, 2006, 2022
 Fermanagh Intermediate Football Championship (5)
 1971, 1977, 1984, 2013, 2020
 Fermanagh Junior Football Championship (3)
 1989, 1998, 2004
 Ulster Minor Club Football Championship: (2)
 1988, 2017

Hurling
 Fermanagh Senior Hurling Championship: (2)
 1979, 1990

References

External links
 Official Enniskillen Gaels club website

Gaelic football clubs in County Fermanagh
Gaelic games clubs in County Fermanagh